The 1973 Delaware State Hornets football team represented Delaware State College—now known as Delaware State University—as a member of the Mid-Eastern Athletic Conference (MEAC) in the 1973 NCAA Division II football season. Led by seventh-year head coach Arnold Jeter, the Hornets compiled an overall record of 0–11 and a mark of 0–6 in conference play, placing last out of seven teams in the MEAC. Their 0–11 record is tied for the worst in school history, with 1998 and 2016.

Schedule

References

Delaware State
Delaware State Hornets football seasons
Delaware State Hornets football